Mokro Polje is a village in Šibenik-Knin County, Croatia. It is one of the largest villages in the municipality of Ervenik. The river Zrmanja flows through Mokro Polje. The 2011 census listed 227 inhabitants.

History
The Orthodox Church of St. Luka, built in 1537, is located within the village cadastral area. During the Croatian War, Mokro Polje was included in the Republic of Serbian Krajina (1991–95).

Demographics
According to the 2011 census, the village of Mokro Polje has 227 inhabitants. This represents 28.27% of its pre-war population according to the 1991 census.

The 1991 census recorded that 99.75% of the village population were ethnic Serbs (801/803) while 0.25% were of other ethnic origin (2/803).

{{Kretanje broja stanovnika
 |naslov  = 'Historical population 1857-2011 Naselja i stanovništvo Republike Hrvatske 1857-2001, www.dzs.hr
 |dimx    = 550
 |dimy    = 500
 |stanmax = 1950
 |crta1   = 200
 |crta2   = 100
 |a1      = 1857
 |a2      = 1869
 |a3      = 1880
 |a4      = 1890
 |a5      = 1900
 |a6      = 1910
 |a7      = 1921
 |a8      = 1931
 |a9      = 1948
 |a10     = 1953
 |a11     = 1961
 |a12     = 1971
 |a13     = 1981
 |a14     = 1991
 |a15     = 2001
 |a16     = 2011
 |p1      = 1051
 |p2      = 1192
 |p3      = 1247
 |p4      = 1351
 |p5      = 1663
 |p6      = 1727
 |p7      = 1668
 |p8      = 1791
 |p9      = 1863
 |p10     = 1910
 |p11     = 1718
 |p12     = 1355
 |p13     = 1119
 |p14     = 803
 |p15     = 211
 |p16     = 227
 |izvor   = Croatian Bureau of Statistics
 }}

Sights and events
 Orthodox Church of St. Luka
 Monument to the fallen partisans and victims of fascism - built in 1952 and destroyed in November 1996  
 Mokropoljski susreti'' - a sporting and cultural event taking place at the end of July

Notable natives and residents
 Mira Bjedov (born 1955) - a former basketball player who competed for Yugoslavia in the 1980 Summer Olympics.

Gallery

References

Populated places in Šibenik-Knin County
Serb communities in Croatia